Betta livida is a species of gourami endemic to Malaysia, where it is only known from the state of Selangor.

References

Endemic fauna of Malaysia
Freshwater fish of Malaysia
livida
Fish described in 1992
Taxa named by Ng Peter Kee Lin
Taxa named by Maurice Kottelat
Taxonomy articles created by Polbot